Mir Mohammad Murad Beg (1780-1840s) was Khan of Kunduz (modern Afghanistan) in the 19th century. Earlier in the 19th century, he defeated Mir Yar Beg to take control of Badakhshan, and extended his rule north of the Oxus river. Ahmed Beg was his dewan.

References

19th-century Afghan people
History of Kunduz Province
Year of death missing
Year of birth missing

Slave traders
19th-century businesspeople